Spindrift Sailing Yacht is located in Fairfield Township, Cumberland County, New Jersey, United States. The yacht was built in 1882 and was added to the National Register of Historic Places on April 22, 1982.

See also
National Register of Historic Places listings in Cumberland County, New Jersey

References

1882 ships
National Register of Historic Places in Cumberland County, New Jersey
New Jersey Register of Historic Places
Fairfield Township, Cumberland County, New Jersey